3352 McAuliffe, provisional designation , is a rare-type asteroid and suspected binary system, classified as near-Earth object of the Amor group, approximately 2 kilometers in diameter. It was discovered on 6 February 1981, by American astronomer Norman Thomas at Lowell's Anderson Mesa Station near Flagstaff, Arizona, United States.

Originally, this asteroid was the target of the 1998 Deep Space 1 mission, but that mission was eventually rerouted to 9969 Braille. It was named in memory of Challenger crew member Christa McAuliffe.

Orbit 

McAuliffe orbits the Sun at a distance of 1.2–2.6 AU once every 2 years and 7 months (941 days). Its orbit has an eccentricity of 0.37 and an inclination of 5° with respect to the ecliptic.

Due to its eccentric orbit, McAuliffe is also a Mars-crosser. As no precoveries were taken, and no prior identifications were made, the body's observation arc begins with its official discovery observation at Anderson Mesa in 1981.

Physical characteristics

Spectral type 

In the SMASS taxonomy, McAuliffe is a rare A-type asteroid, meaning that it is rich in olivine. In addition, the large-scale survey conducted by PanSTARRS also classified as a SQ-type, a transitional type between the common stony and Q-type asteroids, indicating the presence of pyroxene minerals.

Diameter and albedo 

The Collaborative Asteroid Lightcurve Link assumes an albedo of 0.18 and derives a diameter of 1.99 kilometers, based on an absolute magnitude of 16.068, a figure previously obtained by the Wide-field Infrared Survey Explorer with its subsequent NEOWISE mission, and later revised by Czech astronomer Petr Pravec.

Rotation period 

Between 1998 and 2016, several rotational lightcurves of McAuliffe were obtained from photometric observations taken by astronomers Petr Pravec at Ondřejov Observatory, Czech Republic, by Andreas Howell at Willowcroft Observatory, Florida, as well as by Brian Warner at his Palmer Divide Observatory, Colorado, and at the Center for Solar System Studies, California. The best-rated lightcurve gave a rotation period of 2.206 to 2.212 hours with a brightness variation between 0.08 and 0.12 magnitude.

Suspected moon 

During the photometric observations in March 2012, Brian Warner found evidence of the existence of a minor-planet moon orbiting McAuliffe every 20.86 hours. However, it is only a "possible" synchronous binary system, as no mutual eclipsing/occultation events were observed. Follow-up observations in September and October 2016, did not confirm the binary nature of McAuliffe.

DS 1 mission 

McAuliffe together with comet 76P/West–Kohoutek–Ikemura had been the original fly-by targets for the Deep Space 1 (DS1) mission. 
Launched was scheduled for 1 July 1998. A delay in the delivery of the spacecraft's power electronics system as well as insufficient time to test the flight software, caused the launch to be postponed to 24 October 1998. Due to this delay, new targets had to be selected.

In July 1999, DS1 passed the alternative target 9969 Braille a distance of 15 kilometers, in January 2001, comet 107P/Wilson–Harrington was encountered, and in September 2001, short-period comet 19P/Borrelly was passed at distance of only 2,200 kilometers.

Naming 

This minor planet was named in memory of Christa McAuliffe (1948–1986), teacher, civilian astronaut and one of the seven crew members who died in the Space Shuttle Challenger disaster on 28 January 1986. The approved naming citation was published by the Minor Planet Center on 26 March 1986.

Notes

References

External links 
 Lightcurve plot of 3352 McAuliffe, Palmer Divide Observatory, B. D. Warner (2012)
 Lightcurve plot of 3352 McAuliffe, Center for Solar System Studies, B. D. Warner (2016)
 Asteroid Lightcurve Database (LCDB), query form (info )
 Dictionary of Minor Planet Names, Google books
 Asteroids and comets rotation curves, CdR – Observatoire de Genève, Raoul Behrend
 
 
 

003352
Discoveries by Norman G. Thomas
Named minor planets
003352
19810206